Shankill United Football Club is a Northern Irish, intermediate football club playing in the Premier Division of the Northern Amateur Football League. They play their home matches at the Hammer pitch on Agnes Street in the Shankill area of Belfast although for the 2012–13 season they relocated to the Inverary Park ground in the east of the city. The club was founded in 1971 as Harland & Wolff Rec., changing its name to Harland & Wolff Sports in 1984. In 2007, it adopted its present name.

Honours

Intermediate honours
Northern Amateur Football League: 1
1990–91
Clarence Cup: 3
1986–87, 1988–89, 1991–92

Notable people
Jamie Marks
Robbie Morris

Notes

External links
 nifootball.co.uk - (For fixtures, results and tables of all Northern Ireland amateur football leagues)

Association football clubs in Northern Ireland
Association football clubs established in 1971
Association football clubs in Belfast
Northern Amateur Football League clubs
1971 establishments in Northern Ireland
Works association football teams in Northern Ireland